The Vamar is a shipwreck (which sank on March 21, 1942) near Mexico Beach, Florida, United States. It is located 3.7 miles offshore from Mexico Beach. It became the ninth Florida Underwater Archaeological Preserve when it was dedicated in 2004. On April 10, 2006, it was added to the U.S. National Register of Historic Places.

History
The Vamar underwent several name changes in its history:
 1919 - 1920 built as a gun boat for the Royal Navy, named HMS Kilmarnock
 1920 - 1923 S.S. Kilmarnock
 1926 - S.S. Kilmarnock, registered Canadian
 1928 - renamed the Chelsea after being sold to a private firm
 1928 - 1930 Rear-Admiral Richard Byrd acquired the ship for his journey to Antarctica. He renamed the ship the Eleanor Bolling, in honor of his mother, Eleanor Bolling Byrd. During the voyage, due to rough seas, the crew nicknamed the ship the "Evermore Rolling".
 1930 - sold to a seal hunting company
 1933 - the Vamar Shipping Company bought the ship and renamed it the Vamar
 1941 - sold to Bolivar-Atlantic Navigation Company, registered Panama
 1942 - March 21, after leaving Port St. Joe, Florida carrying a load of lumber to Cuba, Vamar ran aground, capsized and sunk in heavy seas in 25 feet of water off Mexico Beach, Florida under suspicious circumstances. The pilot reported that the ship was overloaded and top heavy. Local suspicions that the ship had been sabotaged to block the channel into Port St. Joe led to a Coast Guard investigation, which was unable to verify the suspicions. 
 2004 - Vamar became Florida's Ninth Florida Underwater Archaeological Preserve and was listed on the National Register of Historic Places.

References

External links
 Original Vamar Underwater Archaeological Preserve Proposal (pdf or MS Word format) at The Underwater Archaeological Preserves
Museums in the Sea Vamar

Parks in Bay County, Florida
National Register of Historic Places in Bay County, Florida
Shipwrecks on the National Register of Historic Places in Florida
Florida Underwater Archaeological Preserves
1919 ships
Maritime incidents in March 1942